Mata Sy Diallo (born c. 1945) is a Senegalese politician.

Known as the "lion of Ndoukoumane", her birthplace, Diallo comes from a modest background. She began her career in local politics in Kaolack before rising to national prominence. She served in the cabinet as minister for immigration from 1991 to 1992; she was the vice-president of the National Assembly from 1995 to 2001, and in 2003 was elected president of the Mouvement National des Femmes de l'Espoir et du Progrès. She has also been active in the leadership of the Socialist Party of Senegal. She is a member of the Toucouleur people, and was also active early in her career in Kaffrine.

References

1940s births
Year of birth uncertain
Living people
Women government ministers of Senegal
Immigration ministers of Senegal
Industry ministers of Senegal
Trade ministers of Senegal
Members of the National Assembly (Senegal)
Socialist Party of Senegal politicians
20th-century Senegalese women politicians
20th-century Senegalese politicians
21st-century Senegalese women politicians
21st-century Senegalese politicians
People from Kaffrine Region
People from Kaolack